The Malad River is a  tributary of the Bear River in southeastern Idaho and northern Utah in the western United States.

Description
The river flows southward, beginning northwest of Malad City, Idaho, crosses the Idaho-Utah state line just north of Portage, Utah, flows through Tremonton, and empties into the Bear River just south of Bear River City.

Malad River was so named on account of the river making pioneers sick, malade meaning "sick" in French.

See also

 List of rivers of Idaho
 List of rivers of Utah
 List of longest streams of Idaho

References

External links

Bear River (Great Salt Lake)
Rivers of Idaho
Rivers of Utah
Rivers of Oneida County, Idaho
Rivers of Box Elder County, Utah
Great Salt Lake watershed